Leucophlebia caecilie is a moth of the family Sphingidae. It is known from Cameroon.

References

Leucophlebia
Moths described in 2003